John Butler of Kilcash (died 1570) was an Irish landowner and soldier. A younger son of James Butler, 9th Earl of Ormond and brother of Thomas Butler, 10th Earl of Ormond, he received Kilcash Castle as appanage. He fought in the Desmond–Ormond conflict and was badly wounded in 1563, just before the Battle of Affane. He was the start-point of the Kilcash branch of the Ormonds and the father of Walter Butler, 11th Earl of Ormond.

Birth and origins 
John was born about 1537 in southern Ireland. He was the third son of James Butler and his wife Joan Fitzgerald. His father was the 9th Earl of Ormond. His father's family, the Butler dynasty, was Old English and descended from Theobald Walter, who had been appointed Chief Butler of Ireland by King Henry II in 1177.

His mother was a daughter of James FitzGerald, 10th Earl of Desmond. Her family were the FitzGeralds of Desmond, a cadet branch of the Old English Geraldines, whose senior branch were the FitzGeralds of Kildare. John had six brothers, which are listed in his father's article.

Appanage and father's death 
On 26 May 1544 when he was still a little boy, his father, the 9th Earl of Ormond, granted him Kilcash as an appanage as is attested by his territorial designation of Kilcash. The existing tower house at Kilcash was probably built at that time.

Well he did so. Because only a bit more than a year later, on 28 October 1546, when John was about six, his father suddenly died in London having been poisoned during a banquet at Ely House, probably at the instigation of Anthony St Leger, who was Lord Deputy of Ireland and a political opponent. John's eldest brother Thomas succeeded as the 10th Earl.

Marriage and children 
John Butler of Kilcash married Katherine MacCarthy Reagh, the daughter of Cormac na Haoine MacCarthy Reagh, 10th Prince of Carbery and sister of Donal, later known as Donal of the Pipes, 17th Prince of Carbery.

John and Katherine had four children, two sons:
James Butler, died childless before September 1576;
Walter Butler, 11th Earl of Ormond (1559–1633), known as "Walter of the Beads".

—and two daughters;
Joan, married Sir Oliver Shortall, knight.
Eleanor, married Thomas Prendergast; their son James Prendergast was killed in 1627 by Edmond Butler, 3rd/13th Baron Dunboyne;

Desmond – Ormond conflict 
Much of Kilcash's life was taken up with a fierce feud his family had with the Earls of Desmond. The Desmonds were the Ormonds' neighbours on the western and southern sides. Despite their enmity, these two families were both more or less Gaelicized Old English and had intermarried many times; the last such marriage having been that of Kilcash's parents as his mother was a Desmond FitzGerald. The Desmond wars should also be seen in the wider picture of the Tudor conquest of Ireland. In 1560 his mother's intervention secured a peaceful outcome to a stand-off at Bohermore (known as "the battle that never was").

In 1563 Kilcash was badly wounded in a fight with the Desmonds and his recovery was deemed uncertain. He was unable to participate in the private Battle of Affane, which was fought on 8 February 1565, only a bit more than a month after his mother's death. His stepfather, Gerald FitzGerald, 14th Earl of Desmond was taken prisoner in the battle after Kilcash's brother Edmund had shot him into the hip with his pistol. Lord Ormond (his eldest brother) and Lord Desmond were called to London and promised to keep the peace.

Desmond Rebellions 

Kilcash could of course also not fight to suppress the Desmond Rebellions that were started in 1569 by James fitz Maurice FitzGerald, captain of the Desmond forces in the earl's absence. The captain was supported by many Irish in southern Ireland but also by some of Butler's brothers, notably Edmund. The rebellion was directed against Henry Sidney the Lord Deputy of Ireland. Kilcash's brother Thomas, Lord Ormond returned to Ireland landing at Waterford in July 1569 whereupon his brothers submitted quickly.

However, Edmund, Edward and Piers were attainted in April 1570 by an act of the Irish Parliament. That meant that Edmund ceased to be Ormond's heir presumptive and John, the next brother, took his place but only for about a month as he died on 10 May 1570. John's eldest son, Walter, thereafter became heir presumptive. James fitz Maurice FitzGerald surrendered on 23 February 1573 and Gerald followed in September ending the first Desmond rebellion.

Death and timeline 
John Butler died on 10 May 1570 at Kilcash and was buried in Kilkenny.

Notes and references

Notes

Citations

Sources 

 
  (for Desmond)
 
 
  – N to R (for Ormond)
  – Scotland and Ireland
 
 
  – (for timeline)
 
 
 
  – Viscounts (for Viscount Mountgarret)
  – Viscounts, barons (for "Butler, Lord Cahier" — Dunboyne)
  – 14th Earl of Desmond
 

1570 deaths
John
16th-century Irish people
People of Elizabethan Ireland
Younger sons of earls
Year of birth unknown